Geir-Asbjørn Jørgensen (born 16 December 1972) is a Norwegian politician.

He was elected representative to the Storting from the constituency of Nordland for the period 2021–2025, for the Red Party.

References

1972 births
Living people
Red Party (Norway) politicians
Nordland politicians
Members of the Storting